Kulpino is a rural locality (a village) in Yershovskoye Rural Settlement, Sheksninsky District, Vologda Oblast, Russia. The population was 14 as of 2002.

Geography 
Kulpino is located 29 km northwest of Sheksna (the district's administrative centre) by road. Tirkovo is the nearest rural locality.

References 

Rural localities in Sheksninsky District